In the United Kingdom, a pauper's funeral was a funeral for a pauper paid for under the Poor Law. This policy addressed the condition of the poor people of Britain, such as those living in the workhouses, where a growing population of the British ended their days from the 1850s to the 1860s. This period saw between 32 and 48 percent increase in the proportion of the elderly and the sick paupers in these institutions. An account described how poor people could not avail themselves of the funeral relief until they entered the workhouse.

The common law right of the dead to a dignified burial was first recognized in England in the 1840 case Rex v. Stewart, 12 AD. & E. 773.

The phrase is still sometimes used, both in the UK and some Commonwealth countries, to describe a public health funeral (or equivalent service outside the UK): a basic burial paid for by the local authority when funeral arrangements cannot (or will not) be made by the family of the deceased. For instance, due to the inability of some families to pay for funeral costs the local authorities pay for the expenses of around 4,000 burials in the country every year.

See also
 Potter's field

References

Funerals in the United Kingdom